Flavio Cipolla and Daniele Giorgini were the defending champions, but decided not to participate.

Victor Anagnastopol and Florin Mergea won the title after defeating Dušan Lojda and Benoît Paire 6–2, 6–3 in the final.

Seeds

Draw

Draw

References
 Main Draw

Ropharma Brasov Challenger - Doubles
BRD Brașov Challenger